Fight Back! is the first full-length album by experimental rock group Icy Demons.

Track listing
"Young One"
"Icy Demons"
"Manny'S"
"Bitter Moon"
"Detachable Face"
"The Silent Hero"
"Chimatown"
"Desert Toll - Spirit Guide"
"Simian Warlords"
"Wet Sweater"
"Vera May"
"Bowser"
"Bitter Sun"

References

External links
itunes site
Official MySpace Page

2004 albums
Icy Demons albums